Rosa Scarlatti (1727– 15 December 1775) was an Italian opera singer.

She was the niece of Alessandro or Domenico Scarlatti and the sister of composer Giuseppe Scarlatti (1723-1777). She married composer Francesco Uttini in 1753, and became the mother of the ballet dancer Carlo Uttini.

Rosa Scarlatti was active as an opera singer in Florence in 1747. In 1752-53 and again in 1755–57, she was engaged in the Italian Opera company at the Swedish royal court. She also performed at Public concerts at the Swedish House of Lords. After the Italian Opera company was dissolved, she served as a concert singer at the royal court: she was still paid salary in the capacity of a court singer in 1772, though by this time she was no longer deemed suitable to serve.

References 
 https://web.archive.org/web/20120227151329/http://www.riddarhuset.se/jsp/admin/archive/sbdocarchive/Vetenskap_%20Konst.pdf (In Swedish)
 Gunhild Karle (2002). Kungl. Hovmusiken i Stockholm och dess utövare 1697–1771. Uppsala: TryckJouren. 
 Eleanor Selfridge-Field: A New Chronology of Venetian Opera and Related Genres, 1660-1760
 Fredrik August Dahlgren: Förteckning öfver svenska skådespel uppförda på Stockholms theatrar 1737-1863 och Kongl. Theatrarnes personal 1773–1863. Med flera anteckningar. sid 50-51

1727 births
1775 deaths
Italian opera singers
18th-century Italian people
Age of Liberty people
Italian emigrants to Sweden